Jose Emilio Fuentes Fonseca (JEFF) is an artist who was born in Cuba in 1974. He came to live in Havana at 7 years old, where he still lives and works today. He is frequently referred to as a "Naïve" or "Outsider" artist, since he principally works on themes such as childhood and childishness with a visible passion for toys and children’s art.

Life and career
JEFF’s work has been influenced by his own experience, as he was brought up by his grandparents, and spent his childhood separated from his parents in Oriente Province. When he was 9 years old, his brother found a stick of dynamite and brought it home, JEFF’s curiosity made him lose 3 fingers. From that moment, his work has always aimed at denouncing this world of omnipresent danger. He manipulates the children’s language to create a surprising impression of simplicity. Sailboats made of jagged, rusty metal, or wooden trains transporting severed limbs are some of the toys he created.

JEFF began studying art at age 13. When he was age 21, got a grant from the Ludwig Foundation of Cuba (LFC) to produce his Landscape at 21 installation. In 1994, his first solo exhibition at Havana’s Museo Municipal de Alquízar Álvaro Reinoso Valdez with El Rostro Innocente (in English: The Innocent Face) he received his first recognition as a significant artist. El Rostro Innocente installation featured a classroom full of broken chairs in which on the back of each chair was a pair of lead wings and paintings of fetuses with congenital birth defects covered the classroom walls.

JEFF was a guest artist of the Havana Biennial from March 27 to April 30, 2009. He created a herd of 12 metal elephants, which he moved from place to place throughout the city during the night.

Awards – Recognition

Collective Exhibitions

Solo exhibitions

References

External links

Cuban contemporary artists
Cuban sculptors
1974 births
Living people
Artists from Havana